Post-amendment to the Tamil Nadu Entertainments Tax Act 1939 on 1 April 1958, Gross jumped to 140 per cent of Nett  Commercial Taxes Department disclosed 37 crore in entertainment tax revenue for the year.

The following is a list of films produced in the Tamil film industry in India in 1982, in alphabetical order.

1982

References 

1982
Films, Tamil
Lists of 1982 films by country or language
1980s Tamil-language films